Zdeňka Deitchová (born May 18, 1928 in Prague, Czechoslovakia) is a Czech animator and production manager, and the director for the Bratři v triku studio. Deitchová worked on a variety of projects like Krtek and other films. She was married to American animator Gene Deitch until his death in 2020.

Early life 
Zdeňka Najmanová was born on May 18, 1928 in Prague, Czechoslovakia. Her father worked for Czechoslovak Railways. In 1935 after her mother died suddenly, she was raised by her father, František Hrachovec, and her older brother, František Hrachovec. In Prague, she attended and graduated from the School of Applied Arts.

Career 
Deitchová got a job as an animator at the Bratři v triku studio. Eventually, she was promoted to production manager and was put in charge of the studio's international contract work. In this job, she met William Snyder and worked on a variety of his films. Through her work with William Snyder, she met Gene Deitch, who she later married. She then became the director of the studio and worked on a variety of projects like Krtek. Deitchová also taught at the Animation Department of the Film and TV School of the Academy of Performing Arts in Prague (FAMU).

Legacy 
In 2005 after working in the industry for over 55 years, she retired. In 2014, Deitchová was interviewed by the nonprofit Post Bellum as part of their Stories of the 20th Century project.

Filmography

References 

1928 births
Living people
Czech animators
Czech animated film directors
Czech animated film producers
Stop motion animators
Czech women animators
Czech women film directors
Unit production managers
Academy of Arts, Architecture and Design in Prague alumni